Puncturella pelex is a species of sea snail, a marine gastropod mollusk in the family Fissurellidae, the keyhole limpets and slit limpets.

The epithet uses the Greek word for "helmet".

Description
The shell reaches a size of 6 mm.

Distribution
This marine species occurs off Japan and in the East China Sea.

References

 Poppe G.T. & Tagaro S.P. (2020). The Fissurellidae from the Philippines with the description of 26 new species. Visaya. suppl. 13: 1-131

External links
 Adams A. (1860). On some new genera and species of Mollusca from Japan. Annals and Magazine of Natural History. ser. 3, 5: 299-303 [April 1860]; 405-413
 Cunha T.J., Lemer S., Bouchet P., Kano Y. & Giribet G. (2019). Putting keyhole limpets on the map: phylogeny and biogeography of the globally distributed marine family Fissurellidae (Vetigastropoda, Mollusca). Molecular Phylogenetics and Evolution. 135: 249-269
 To Encyclopedia of Life
 To World Register of Marine Species
 

Fissurellidae
Gastropods described in 1860